Christophe Bouillon (born 4 March 1969) was a member of the National Assembly of France from 2007 to 2020.  He represented Seine-Maritime's 5th constituency as a member of the Socialist, Radical, Citizen and Miscellaneous Left. From 2015 to 2018 he was chairman of the board of ANDRA, the French National Radioactive Waste Management Agency.

He was elected mayor of Barentin on 28 May 2020 and resigned from the National Assembly on 18 June because of cumulation of mandates. His substitute, Bastien Coriton, was also elected mayor in Rives-en-Seine, so resigned from the assembly five days after taking office. A by-election was called for 20 and 27 September 2020.

References

1969 births
Living people
Politicians from Rouen
University of Rouen Normandy alumni
Mayors of places in Normandy
Socialist Party (France) politicians
Deputies of the 13th National Assembly of the French Fifth Republic
Deputies of the 14th National Assembly of the French Fifth Republic
Deputies of the 15th National Assembly of the French Fifth Republic